Fort Morgan High School is a public high school located in Fort Morgan, Colorado, United States, in Morgan County. It is one of two public high school's located in the town along with Lincoln High School.

History
The school was first established in the 1920s. In 1931, robbers broke into the principal's office and stole $50 worth of student funds. In 1965 a new school building was constructed to replace the old one, which became a middle school. In 2000, the school was closed for four months after an asbestos cleanup went awry.

The school football team were state champions in 1911,1952, 1999, and 2021.

Student demographics
The demographic breakdown of the 879 students enrolled for the 2020-2021 school year was:
American Indian - 0.46%
Asian - 0.57%
Black - 5.7%
Hispanic - 63.5%
White - 29%
Biracial - 0.8%
The demographic breakdown for student by gender was 464 male students and 415 female students.

Notable people

Glenn Miller - famous band leader
Lola Spradley - first woman to serve as speaker of the Colorado House of Representatives
Trey McBride - American football player
Stan Matsunaka - American politician
Brenton Metzler - TV producer
Don Welch - poet
Ryan Jensen - American football player
Joel Dreessen - American football player

Further reading
Maroons to Mustangs; Fort Morgan High School, 1966-1996 (1997)

References

External links

District website

Public high schools in Colorado
Fort Morgan, Colorado